Vellathuval  is a village in Idukki district in the Indian state of Kerala.

Demographics
 India census, Vellathuval had a population of 14845 with 7425 males and 7420 females.

Schools
 Vellathooval Highschool

Places of Worship
 Vellathooval Sree Annapurna Devi Temple
 vellathooval town juma masjid
 St George Forane Church
 St Jude Chappel
 St Alphonsa church
 Sharon Fellowship Church(Pentecostal Church)
 India Pentecostal Church of God
 Bethel Marthoma Church
 Noorul Hudha Juma Masjid Selliampara
 Sreekrishna Swami Temple
 Ayyappan Temple Vellathooval

Offices 
 Sengulam Hydro Electric Project
 Panniar Hydro Electric Project
 Vellathooval post office
 Co-operative bank
 SBI Vellathooval 
 Vellathooval police Station
 Vellathooval Panchyath office
 Krishi Bhavan Vellathooval 
 G.H Vellathooval
 Vellathooval Small Hydro Electric Project

Notable people
Aswathy Sasikumar, short story writer, who is the recipient of 2017 Yuva Puraskar.

References

Villages in Idukki district